Orbea is a Spanish bicycle manufacturer.

Orbea may also refer to:
 Artiach (cycling team), known as Orbea in 1984 and 1985
 Euskadi (Continental cycling team), known as Orbea between 2005 and 2012
 Orbea (plant), a genus of flowering plants native to Africa